AFC Metalul Buzău, commonly known as Metalul Buzău, is a Romanian professional football club based in Buzău, Romania, founded in 1954. Currently the team plays in Liga III.

History

AFC Metalul Buzău was founded in 1954 as AS Metalul Buzău and was set up by the trade union of IUT Buzău. From the first season to the 1966 season, the team evolved into the county championship and in autumn of 66, the city of Buzău returned with a team in Divizia C, this team was Metalul.

In 1971, through a reorganization of the football from Buzău, Gloria Buzău was formed and taking a part of Metalul's players and the place in Divizia C, Gloria succeeded in the 1971–72 Divizia C season to occupy the 1st place in the series and after a play-off match at Ploiești to promote in Divizia B.

At the insistence of the workers from the IUT factory, in 1982 the football team was re-established. At that time Steaua Săhăteni, a small team from Buzău County played in Divizia C. Buzoienii merged with the team from Săhăteni and took its place in Liga III.

In 1996, following the association with CORD Buzău, Metalul became Metalcord Buzău. The last edition in which the team from Buzău evolved in the Liga III under this name was 2005–06 Divizia C season.

In the summer of 2007, the club returned to its former name AS Metalul Buzău and participated annually in the Buzău County Championship, the equivalent of the Liga IV in the Romanian football system.

The team was taken over in 2013 by the company Revicom Oil, changing its name in AFC Metalul Buzău.

At the end of 2016–17 Metalul won Liga IV-Buzău County and the promotion play-off match against CS Amara 9–2 on aggregate and promoted back to Liga III after 10 years of absence.

In the 2019-2020, Metalul achieved the club's best performance in Cupa României when reached Round of 16, after winning against Avântul Zărnești (3-0 by FA decision; 2nd Round), SCM Gloria Buzău (3-2 after pen.; 3rd Round), CSM Focșani (1-0 a.e.t.; 4th Round), FK Miercurea Ciuc (1-0; Round of 32) and losing to Politehnica Iași (0-3; Round of 16).

Stadium
The club plays its home matches on Metalul Stadium from Buzău.

Rivalries
Although it is the oldest active football club in the Buzău County, Metalul has always lived in the shadow of Gloria Buzău, thus becoming their rivals.

Honours
Liga IV – Buzău County
Winners (5): 1981–82, 2002–03, 2004–05, 1989–90, 2016–17
Runners-up (1): 2015–16

Ploiești Regional Championship
Winners (1): 1965–66

Players

First team squad

Out on loan

Club officials

Board of directors

Current technical staff

League history

References

External links 

Official website

Football clubs in Buzău County
Sport in Buzău
Association football clubs established in 1954
Liga III clubs
Liga IV clubs
1954 establishments in Romania